Aktien-Gesellschaft „Weser" (abbreviated A.G. „Weser”) was one of the major  German shipbuilding companies, located at the Weser River in Bremen. Founded in 1872 it was finally closed in 1983. All together, A.G. „Weser" built about 1,400 ships of different types, including many warships. A.G. „Weser" was the leading company in the Deutsche Schiff- und Maschinenbau AG, a cooperation of eight German shipbuilding companies between 1926 and 1945.

History

Founding of A.G. „Weser” 
Aktien-Gesellschaft „Weser” - short A.G. „Weser” - was founded as a successor of the 1843 founded Eisengiesserei & Maschinenbau-Anstalt Waltjen und Leonhard,. This company with its premises was situated on an area called Stephanikirchenweide at the periphery of the ancient town of Bremen. It was an iron-foundry and machine factory with a wide-ranging production volume of iron-made parts as bridges, cranes, floodgates, steam boiler, steam engines etc. In 1846 Mr. Leonhard left the company and the company's name was changed to  C. Waltjen & Co. In the same year the first vessel was built. First greater ship was 1847 the 346 GRT paddle-steamer Roland, used as tug- and passenger boat. Almost 50 years this ship was in service on the river Weser. More shipbuilding activities followed including three torpedo-boats for the Kaiserliche Marine (Imperial German Navy) in 1871.

Because of the increasing importance of the shipbuilding industry some influential Bremen merchants, bankers and politicians decided in 1872 to establish a new and greater company on shares. The production program of this new company named Actien-Gesellschaft „Weser” was „construction of ships of all kind and marine engineering”.
The company Waltjen & Co. was bought and the owner Mr. Carsten Waltjen himself became a member of the new company's board.

The new shipyard started shipbuilding with some smaller vessels. The first important order came from the Kaiserliche Marine when several gunboats were built. Besides these warships the construction of ships at A.G. „Weser” was mainly for civil use in the following years.

Because of the growing incoming orders and the enlarged dimensions of ships it soon became necessary to enlarge the yard facilities and mainly the slipways. In 1901 the company started to lease some terrain at the entrance to the new Bremen ports some miles downstream the Weser at the Bremen suburb Gröpelingen. Production and personnel then were gradually shifted from the old yard to the new premises. For the first four slipways and one floating dock, workshops, magazines etc. were established at the new terrain, capable to construct ships of all dimensions and categories. But when it soon became necessary to enlarge the shipyard additional terrain was bought in the following years.

Between the founding of the company in 1872 and 1916 about 125 units of the so-called Self-Powered Vessels were constructed on the wharf, including passenger- and merchant ships, tug boats etc. Besides this many small units without propulsion were built as barges, pontoons, floating docks etc. as well as four sailing ships 1875/77. For DDG Hansa of Bremen, the company built the three largest freight steamers constructed up to that time, the 8,315 GRT Frankenfels, Schwarzenfels and Falkenfels; these were also the last civilian ships it delivered before World War I.

Deschimag Period 
After WW I A.G. „Weser” continued very soon in shipbuilding. In 1926, when shipbuilding became extremely difficult, A.G. „Weser” merged with seven other German shipyards to form Deutsche Schiff- und Maschinenbau AG (Deschimag), wherein the now named  Deschimag A.G. „Weser  took the leading position. Most of the shipyards joining Deschimag were closed, sold or went bankrupt in the following years. Only A.G. „Weser” and Seebeckwerft in Bremerhaven, which was taken over in 1928, survived.

In 1929 the passenger-liner Bremen was put into service, built for the shipping company Norddeutscher Lloyd. It was the most famous liner ever built by A.G. „Weser” and one of the most famous German civilian ships. After delivery of the Bremen more than 5,000 of altogether about 12,000 coworkers of the shipyard were set free because of lack of new orders. After the last ship was delivered 1931, for about three years no ship-newbuilding followed, only some repair of ships and construction of engines and marine equipment was done. The first new launched ship was in 1933 the carrier Cairo for the company Norddeutscher Lloyd. Shortly after that the situation improved with several new orders received, including an increasing amount of warships.

Naval Shipbuilding 
A.G. „Weser” was one of the great German manufacturers of warships, besides Blohm & Voss, the imperial shipyards in Kiel, Danzig and Wilhelmshaven, which later became Kriegsmarinewerft Wilhelmshaven, and Schichau Shipyard Danzig. This was contrary to the second great Bremen shipyard Bremer Vulkan, which with exception of both World Wars, only produced civilian ships and started warship-building except war-times only in the early 1980s.

A very first important warship-order came from the Kaiserliche Marine, between 1875 and 1884 altogether 29 gunboats were built. By this A.G. „Weser”  started its career as an important constructor of war ships for the Imperial German Navy (1871 – 1918) first and the Kriegsmarine in the Third Reich (1933 – 1945). Altogether A.G. „Weser” built 146 units for the Imperial Navy and 196 units for the Kriegsmarine (Source: Pamphlet 125th anniversary of AG Weser, 1986). After WW II A.G. „Weser” only built a single warship for the German Navy, in 1979/81 the  F122-type frigate Niedersachsen in collaboration with frigate general contractor Bremer Vulkan.

The share of warships from all delivered new constructions came to about 50% in 1909/10 and increased to nearly 100% in 1916 during World War I. After 1936 it was again about 66% with an increasing share to about 80% in 1938. Construction of warships started in 1936 with the artillery training ship Brummer for the Kriegsmarine, followed by destroyers and U-boats. The last civilian ships built in 1939 were the merchant ships Neidenfels for the German company D.D.G. Hansa and Java for a shipping company in the Netherlands. The latter was the last civilian ship for many years. After that only warships were constructed, mainly U-boats and some destroyers.

The first U-boats constructed were UB I series. Later also UC I, UB II and UC II series were constructed at AG „Weser”. By 1917 most of the work went into the construction of the UB III. Later three UC III were ordered. but were never finished. During World War I, AG „Weser” launched a total of 96 U-boats.

Because of intensive construction of warships, A.G. „Weser” was often the target of Allied air-raids during the Bombing of Bremen in World War II, mainly in 1944 and 1945. But despite many buildings, workshops, magazines, slipways and docks as well as ships and U-boats under construction were damaged, in most cases production could be continued within some weeks. The estimated reduction of construction capacity at the end of war seemed only less than 30%.

In March 1944 the building of the bunker Hornisse (Eng. Hornet) was started near the shipyard. Well-protected from air attacks, it was intended to produce U-boat sections in. These prefabricated sections were then shipped to the U-boat pen Valentin about 30 km downstream the river Weser. Together with parts from Kriegsmarinewerft Wilhelmshaven and under management of Bremer Vulkan beginning end of 1945 monthly 3 U-boats would be completed there. Both bunkers had never been finished and U-boats had never been built there. The bunker Valentin is still existing today and partly used as a memorial to the many prisoners and forced labourers who worked and died there.

After WW II 
The Deschimag was dissolved in 1945 after World War II and the company was renamed to the former Aktien-Gesellschaft „Weser”. With the exception of Seebeckwerft, the dismantling of confiscated production facilities for USSR happened from 1945 to 1948. Most of the production equipment was shipped to Russia and together with the damaged facilities from bombing attacks during the war and the following blasting of the slipways the shipyard was more or less useless after that. Only a restricted production-permission was still possible and allowed by the US military government. While Seebeckwerft received the permission to construct ship's newbuilding in 1949, A.G. „Weser” received this permission finally some years later in 1951. The first new built unit was completed in 1952, the 2,650 GRT carrier Werratal.

A fundamental modernization program was started in 1963. In 1970 the shipyard presented itself in a new modern shape with giant cranes of 500 and 780 tons capacity, which span two slipways for the construction of ships up to 500,000 tons deadweight. Spacious prefabrications workshops with automation equipment and cranes of all sizes were in operation. Ship and engine repairs as well as machinery production and general engineering was performed in well-equipped drydocks and workshops. At this time A.G. „Weser” in Bremen and the affiliated Seebeckwerft in Bremerhaven employed about 8,000 workers and office staff.

The Bremen shipyard A.G. „Weser” concentrated their manufacturing program on all kinds of ships up to approx. 400,000 dwt., the Bremerhaven shipyard Seebeckwerft up to approx. 20,000 dwt. Besides ship-newbuilding, ship repairs and conversion as well as construction of engines and industrial equipment was also carried out.

In the 1970s A.G. „Weser” concentrated their activities on the building of tankers. But this one-sided orientation led to problems when the tanker-boom came to end. Many tanker-orders were cancelled and the lack of orders for other types of ships caused severe financial problems. A closer cooperation between the Bremen shipyards A.G. „Weser” and Bremer Vulkan and the Bremerhaven shipyards Seebeckwerft, Lloydwerft and Schichau-Werft, including a reduction of shipbuilding capacities, could not be realized. As a consequence the shipyard A.G. „Weser” closed on December 31, 1983.

Ships of A.G. „Weser” and its predecessors (selection)
 1847, Serial-No.1, Paddle steamer Roland
 1898, No. 116, Large protected cruiser  for Kaiserliche Marine
 1903–1904, sunk 1915
 1906, Lightship Reserve Sonderburg, 1988 rebuilt at Motorenwerke Bremerhaven to sailing ship Alexander von Humboldt  (nickname „Green Alex“, because of green sails)
 1907, 8.790 GRT mail-and-passenger vessel Goeben for Norddeutscher Lloyd
 1908, Armoured cruiser , sunk December 1914 in the Battle of the Falkland Islands by Royal Navy
 1907-09, participated 1916 Battle of Jütland (in German: Skagerrakschlacht), after war 1920 delivered to Great Britain, 1924 scrapped
 1911, participated Skagerrakschlacht;  1920 delivered to France, 1923-33 scrapped
 1914, participated Skagerrakschlacht, 1918 internment in Scapa Flow, there 1919 self-destructed, 1936 scrapped
 1916-1918, 84 U-boats for Kaiserliche Marine 1926, Rotor ship Barbara with additional propulsion by three Flettner-Rotors (using Magnus-Effect)
 1929, Passenger ship  for shipping company Norddeutscher Lloyd . Won Blue Riband 1929 and 1933 for fastest Atlantic Ocean crossing; the Bremen escaped after beginning of war from New York to Bremerhaven; burnt out 1940 in Bremerhaven, probably by arson
 1937, Passenger-cargo ship , sold to Japan in 1942 and rebuilt as auxiliary aircraft carrier , sunk 1944 by 
 1937, Passenger-cargo ship , sister ship of Scharnhorst but with steam turbine propulsion contrary to Scharnhorsts turboelectric propulsion
 1937, German whale factory ship Unitas for Jürgens-Van den Bergh company (whale hunting vessels were built by Bremer Vulkan); as Japanese Nissan Maru II scrapped in Taiwan 1987
 1937, Merchant ship Kandelfels, in WW II used as auxiliary cruiser , 1941 sunk by British cruiser 
 1938, Merchant ship Ems for shipping company Norddeutscher Lloyd, in WW II used as auxiliary cruiser , 1942 sunk by planes and ships of Royal Air Force and Royal Navy
 1937-1938; Destroyer class 1934A for Kriegsmarine, 4 units Z5 – Z8
 1953–1954, Turbine tankers Olympic Cloud, -Wind, -Storm, -Sky, -Breeze and -Rainbow for Olympic Transportation Co., New York (Owner: Aristoteles Onassis)
 1979, Frigate Niedersachsen for Bundesmarine (German Navy) in collaboration with frigate general contractor Bremer Vulkan
 1983, Cargo ship Ubena for Deutsche Afrika-Linien (DAL) Hamburg was last ship built by AG Weser

References

 Reinhold Thiel; Die Geschichte der Actien-Gesellschaft "Weser" 1843 - 1983, Band I 1843 - 1918, Verlag H.M. Hauschild GmbH, Bremen 2005, 
 Reinhold Thiel; Die Geschichte der Actien-Gesellschaft "Weser" 1843 - 1983, Band II 1919 - 1945, Verlag H.M. Hauschild GmbH, Bremen 2006, 
 Reinhold Thiel; Die Geschichte der Actien-Gesellschaft "Weser" 1843 - 1983, Band III 1945 - 1983'', Verlag H.M. Hauschild GmbH, Bremen 2007, 
 Peter Kuckuk (Hrsg.); Die AG „Weser“ in der Nachkriegszeit (1945 – 1953), Edition Temmen, Bremen 2005,

External links 

 AG Weser Museum Start with „Geschichte“ to look at some ships.
 Ships built by Shipyard AG Weser emigration
 

Shipbuilding companies of Germany
Vehicle manufacturing companies established in 1843
Defunct companies of Germany
Manufacturing companies based in Bremen (state)
Companies based in Bremen
History of Bremen (city)
1843 establishments in Germany